This is a list of stations on the Stockholm metro rapid transit system of Stockholm, Sweden. 

Stations in bold are transfer stations; while lines may share many stations, only stations where lines cross, or stations where lines diverge (such as when Lines 17 and 18 go separate ways) are considered transfer stations.

Lines
:  Kungsträdgården — Hjulsta
:  Kungsträdgården — Akalla
: Norsborg — Ropsten
: Fruängen — Mörby centrum
: Åkeshov — Skarpnäck
: Alvik — Farsta strand
: Hässelby Strand — Hagsätra

Stations

Unused stations

 
Stockholm
Rail
Stockholm metro
Metro stations